Slim Jedaïed (born 20 September 1989) is a retired Tunisian football striker.

References

1989 births
Living people
Tunisian footballers
Étoile Sportive du Sahel players
AS Marsa players
US Monastir (football) players
CS Sfaxien players
JS Kairouan players
Stade Tunisien players
Association football forwards
Tunisian Ligue Professionnelle 1 players